Skarholt is a surname. Notable people with the surname include:

Amund Rasmussen Skarholt (1892–1956), Norwegian politician
Anders Skarholt (born 1986), Norwegian orienteering competitor 
Ola Skarholt (1939–2017), Norwegian orienteering competitor

Surnames of Norwegian origin